Wixon may refer to:

In places
 Wixon Valley, Texas, city in Brazos County, Texas, United States

In people
 David Wixon Pratt, American physicist
 Richard Wixon (born 1957), New Zealand cricketer
 Susan H. Wixon (1839-1912), American freethought writer, editor, feminist, and educator